The 1946 Lafayette Leopards football team was an American football team that represented Lafayette College in the Middle Three Conference during the 1946 college football season. In its seventh and final season under head coach Edward Mylin, the team compiled a 2–7 record and was outscored by a total of 286 to 56. Ed Whiteman was the team captain. The team played its home games at Fisher Field in Easton, Pennsylvania.

Schedule

References

Lafayette
Lafayette Leopards football seasons
Lafayette Leopards football